Homewood is an unincorporated community in south central Manitoba, Canada. It is located approximately 10 kilometers (6 miles) east of Carman, Manitoba  in the Rural Municipality of Dufferin.  The privately owned and operated Homewood Airport is located near the community.

References 

Unincorporated communities in Pembina Valley Region